Efram Potelle is a filmmaker from Portland, Maine, USA. He is now based in Los Angeles.

He co-directed The Battle of Shaker Heights through the second season of HBO's Project Greenlight.

Filmography
Endangered (2022)
Hellholes (2007)
Insex (2006)
Case Tape 347 (2005)
The Battle of Shaker Heights (2003)
Alias: The Lost Episode (2002)
They Came to Attack Us (2001)
Pennyweight (1999)
The Girl in the Basement (1997) (formerly Reindeer Games)
Dorm (1995)

External links
 

English-language film directors
German-language film directors
Participants in American reality television series
Living people
Artists from Portland, Maine
Film directors from Maine
Year of birth missing (living people)